The 1988 World Series was the championship series of Major League Baseball's (MLB) 1988 season. The 85th edition of the World Series, it was a best-of-seven playoff played between the American League (AL) champion Oakland Athletics and the National League (NL) champion Los Angeles Dodgers, with the Dodgers upsetting the heavily favored Athletics to win the Series in five games to win their sixth championship .

The series is best known for the Game 1 pinch-hit walk-off home run by star Dodgers outfielder Kirk Gibson, who did not start because of injuries to both legs yet hit the winning homer against Athletics closer Dennis Eckersley. Although Gibson's homer has become an iconic World Series moment, it was World Series MVP Orel Hershiser who capped a dominant 1988 season in which he set the all time scoreless inning streak at 59 innings, recorded five straight shutouts, led the league with 23 wins and 267 innings, and won the Cy Young and Gold Glove awards. Hershiser was the NL Championship Series MVP, starting three games, getting the save for Game 4, and shutting out the Mets in Game 7. In the World Series, he shut out the A's in Game 2, and pitched a two-run, complete game in the decisive Game 5 victory.

The Dodgers won the NL West division by seven games over the Cincinnati Reds, then upset the New York Mets, 4 games to 3, in the NLCS. The Athletics won the AL West division by 13 games over the Minnesota Twins, then swept the Boston Red Sox, 4 games to 0, in the AL Championship Series.

The Dodgers were the only MLB team to win more than one World Series title in the 1980s, as they had previously won the championship in 1981. Their victory also broke a 10-year streak in which 10 different major league ballclubs won a World Series with no repeat winners. They would not win another World Series until 2020.

Preview

Los Angeles Dodgers

The Dodgers' team batting did not finish in the top five in any offensive statistical category except batting average (fifth), at .248—no regular or backup hit over .300 or drove in over 90 runs. Kirk Gibson's 25 home runs led the team but was only good enough for seventh in the National League. Slugger Pedro Guerrero had a sub-par year and was traded in July to the Cardinals for starting pitcher John Tudor. Kirk Gibson was the only Dodgers position player named to the All-Star Game, but declined the invitation.

However, the Dodgers were sixth in the NL in runs scored and backed that up with excellent pitching. Despite trading  All-Star pitcher Bob Welch (to Oakland, ironically) prior to spring training and an injury to Fernando Valenzuela (5–8, 4.24 ERA), the Dodgers were second in the NL in team ERA and runs allowed, and led the league in complete games and shutouts. The staff was anchored by Cy Young Award-winner Orel Hershiser, who led league in wins, won-loss percentage (23–8, .864), complete games (15), shutouts (8), and sacrifice hits (19).

Hershiser was backed-up by a pair of "Tims", Tim Leary (17–11, 2.91) and rookie Tim Belcher (12–6, 2.91), and the July acquisition of John Tudor further strengthened the staff. The bullpen was outstanding, headed by Jay Howell (21 saves, 2.08), Alejandro Peña (12 saves, 1.91), and longtime New York Mets closer Jesse Orosco. The Dodger bullpen led the league in saves with 49.

It was intensity and fortitude, however, that defined the 1988 Dodgers, a trend that began when Kirk Gibson was signed as a free agent over the winter from the Detroit Tigers, the team he helped lead to the 1984 World Championship. Moreover, the invincible Hershiser threw shutouts in five of his last six regular season starts en route to a record 59 consecutive scoreless innings pitched, breaking the mark held by former Dodger great Don Drysdale. Hershiser would dominate the Mets in the NLCS, while Gibson hobbled through on bad knees and a bruised hamstring but would produce a memorable, if not the greatest, at-bat (in Game 1) of the World Series. Coincidentally, this was the second time the Dodgers had a no-hitter or a perfect game thrown against them in a season ending with a world championship. In 1981, Nolan Ryan tossed his record-breaking fifth no hitter (breaking the mark of four set by Ex-Dodger pitcher Sandy Koufax) against a Dodger team that won the World Series. While in 1988, Tom Browning of the Cincinnati Reds threw a perfect game which was also against a Los Angeles team that won it all.

Oakland Athletics

The powerful Oakland Athletics had all the confidence and swagger of a heavily favored team. The "Bash Brothers" duo of Mark McGwire (32 home runs, 99 RBI, .260 batting average) and José Canseco (42 home runs, 124 RBI, .307 batting average) were in their early 20s, emerging as young superstars. Canseco became the first player to hit 40 or more home runs and steal 40 or more bases in Major League history and would capture the Most Valuable Player award in the American League. Veterans Dave Henderson (24 home runs, 94 RBI, .304 batting average) and longtime Pirate Dave Parker (12 home runs, 55 RBI, .257 batting average), also contributed with both their bats and their experience. The 1988 World Series marked Don Baylor's third consecutive World Series with three separate teams. Besides being a member of the 1988 Athletics, Baylor was also a member of the 1986 Boston Red Sox and 1987 Minnesota Twins.

The Oakland pitching staff was quite possibly the best in the American League in 1988. They led in ERA (3.44), wins (104), saves (64), and were second in strikeouts (983) and second in fewest runs allowed and home runs allowed. The ace of the staff was Dave Stewart, an ex-Dodger (1978–83), who won 20 games for the second straight season. Another ex-Dodger was reliable Bob Welch (17–9, 3.64) followed by 16-game winner Storm Davis. After spending the previous 12 years as a starter, mostly for the Boston Red Sox and Chicago Cubs, Dennis Eckersley would be converted into a closer in 1987 and would lead the American League in saves in 1988 with 45. He would eventually have a distinguished 24-year career, gaining election into the Hall of Fame in 2004. Another longtime starter (and another ex-Dodger), Rick Honeycutt, proved to be a capable set-up man to Eckersley, finishing with three wins and seven saves.

Summary

Matchups

Game 1

With Kirk Gibson unable to start and officially listed as day-to-day due to a pulled left hamstring and a severely swollen right knee, both sustained on awkward slides into second base in the NLCS in Games 5 and 7, the Dodgers were at a decided disadvantage. Additionally, because ace Orel Hershiser pitched in Game 7 of the NLCS, the Dodgers had to start rookie Tim Belcher in Game 1, and thus, they would not be able to start Hershiser three times in a potential seven-game series as they had in the NLCS. Meanwhile, Oakland, having swept the ALCS, could send a well-rested Dave Stewart to the mound. Both pitchers, however, would have their troubles in this game starting out. Belcher loaded the bases in the first by giving up a single to Dave Henderson, then hitting José Canseco and walking Mark McGwire.  Canseco was hit in the right biceps as he checked his swing and home plate umpire Doug Harvey awarded him first base.  Dodger manager Tommy Lasorda disputed this, thinking the ball hit Canseco's bat.  Audio from the game seemed to confirm this, but replays showed the ball hit Canseco in the biceps.

Stewart's problems began in the bottom of the first when he purposely hit Steve Sax with his first pitch. After retiring Franklin Stubbs, Stewart balked Sax to second. Mickey Hatcher, Gibson's replacement in the starting lineup who had hit only one homer all season, then shocked the crowd by hitting a two-run shot off Stewart. Hatcher further excited the Dodger Stadium fans by running full speed around the bases. Commentator Joe Garagiola noted, "He ran in like they thought they were going to take it off the scoreboard! He really circled those bases in a hurry!" and "He's a Saturday Evening Post cover!"

Stewart would calm down, however, and the A's provided him a lead in their half of the second. After allowing a leadoff single to Glenn Hubbard and striking out Walt Weiss, Belcher's control problems continued as he walked both Stewart and Carney Lansford to load the bases. After Dave Henderson struck out, Canseco crushed a 1–0 pitch for a grand slam to almost dead center, denting an NBC game camera in the process. The A's had a 4–2 lead. Canseco's grand slam in Game 1 was his only hit of the series. His fellow Bash Brother Mark McGwire had only one hit as well, the game-winning shot that ended Game 3.

With one out In the sixth, the Dodgers broke Stewart's groove with three consecutive singles by Mike Marshall, John Shelby and Mike Scioscia, which resulted in Marshall scoring. Stewart retired the next two batters to end the inning and strand Shelby in scoring position, but the Dodgers had cut the A's lead to 4–3.

Unknown to the fans and the media at the time, Kirk Gibson was watching the game on television while undergoing physical therapy in the Dodgers' clubhouse. At some point during the game, television cameras scanned the Dodgers dugout and commentator Vin Scully, working for NBC for the 1988 postseason, observed that Gibson was "nowhere to be found". This spurred Gibson to call for Mitch Poole, the team ball boy, to set up the tee for him to take some warm up swings. After a series of warm up swings, Gibson told Poole to go get Lasorda for an evaluation. After a brief stint to get Tommy's attention, Pool informed Lasorda that Gibson was taking practice swings in the clubhouse, where Lasorda went back for the evaluation. Shortly there after, Gibson was seen in the dugout wearing his batting helmet. Along the way, NBC's Bob Costas could hear Gibson's agonized-sounding grunts after every hit.

A's closer Dennis Eckersley came on to pitch the ninth to close it out for Stewart. After retiring the first two batters (Mike Scioscia and Jeff Hamilton), Eckersley's former A's teammate Mike Davis, batting for Alfredo Griffin, walked on five pitches. During Davis' at-bat, Dave Anderson initially entered the on-deck circle to hit for Alejandro Peña. Eckersley pitched carefully to Davis because the A's remembered all of the home runs he hit for the A's a year earlier, not because the light-hitting Anderson was on deck, as popularly believed. After Davis walked, Lasorda called back Anderson and sent up a hobbled Kirk Gibson to the plate, amidst cheers from the Dodger Stadium crowd. Gibson bravely fouled off Eckersley's best offerings, demonstrating how badly he was hurting. On one foul, Gibson hobbled towards first and prompted Scully to quip, "And it had to be an effort to run THAT far." After Gibson fouled off several pitches, Davis stole second on ball three. On the next pitch, the 8th of the at-bat, Gibson, slammed a backdoor slider into the right field bleachers to win the game. The footage of Gibson hobbling around the bases on both hurt legs and pumping his fist as he rounded second became an iconic baseball film highlight.

Gibson would never bat again in the Series, and his walk-off homer in Game 1 marked the first time that a World Series game ended with a come-from-behind home run. In a somewhat forgotten detail of this game highlighting the teamwork that was this Dodgers team's trademark all season, Gibson's heroics still would not have been possible without the earlier home run by the man replacing Gibson in the line-up, Mickey Hatcher.

By the time Kirk Gibson reached his locker after Game 1, bullpen coach Mark Cresse had written "R. HOBBS" on a piece of paper and taped it over Gibson's nameplate, which was in reference to Gibson's heroics mirroring those of the fictional slugger played by Robert Redford in The Natural. Indeed, the next night, NBC replayed the home run, intercutting it with film and music of the Hobbs home run from the movie.

Game 1 is the only game in World Series history such that a grand slam-hitting team both failed to win the game, and also later failed to win the series.  The only other game in series history in which a grand slam-hitting team failed to win the game was 1956's Game 2 (the Yankees); nevertheless, the Yankees prevailed in the series.

Gibson became the second player ever to record a walk-off hit with two outs and his team trailing in the bottom of the ninth inning of a World Series game, following Cookie Lavagetto in the 1947 World Series. Only one other player, Brett Phillips in the 2020 World Series, has since accomplished this feat.

Game 2

With a rested Orel Hershiser on the mound, the Dodgers took a 2–0 Series lead. Hershiser went the distance, allowing only three singles, all three hit by Dave Parker. The Dodgers got to Oakland starter Storm Davis with a five-run third. After one-out singles by Hershiser and Steve Sax, consecutive RBI singles by Franklin Stubbs and Mickey Hatcher made it 2–0 Dodgers before Mike Marshall capped the scoring with a three-run home run. Hershiser himself got an RBI when Alfredo Griffin singled in the fourth and scored on his double. Hershiser was the first pitcher to get three hits in a World Series game since Art Nehf of the New York Giants in Game 1 of the 1924 World Series. He was also the first pitcher to record a World Series RBI since Philadelphia's John Denny in Game 4 of the 1983 World Series.

Game 3

The A's got back in the series on the strength of strong pitching by former Dodger World Series hero Bob Welch and three relievers. Dodger starter John Tudor left during the second inning with tightness in his pitching shoulder and was relieved by Tim Leary who pitched the next  innings and Alejandro Peña who pitched an additional three innings.

The A's struck first in the third when Glenn Hubbard singled, stole second, and came home on a single by Ron Hassey. The Dodgers tied it in the fifth when Franklin Stubbs drove home Jeff Hamilton with a double.

A's relievers helped squelch a Dodger threat in the sixth. Danny Heep led off with a double. John Shelby singled to left, but Heep was held up at third on the throw home as Shelby took second. Welch walked Mike Davis to load the bases, and left-hander Greg Cadaret was brought in to face lefty-hitting Mike Scioscia. Scioscia popped out to third. A's manager Tony La Russa then brought in right-hander Gene Nelson to face Hamilton, who forced Heep out at home. Alfredo Griffin grounded out to end the threat.

Reliever Rick Honeycutt held the Dodgers scoreless in two inning over work. The A's got their winning run in the bottom of the ninth when Mark McGwire deposited a one-out fastball from closer Jay Howell, who had struggled in the NLCS and also was suspended for illegally using pine tar, into the left-center field seats.

Game 4

Without injured sluggers Kirk Gibson (25 HR) and Mike Marshall (20), the Dodgers started the game with what was statistically one of the weakest hitting World Series teams since the Dead-ball era. During the regular season the Game 4 starting line up of Steve Sax (2B), Franklin Stubbs (1B), Mickey Hatcher (LF), Mike Davis (RF), John Shelby (CF), Danny Heep (DH), Jeff Hamilton (3B), Mike Scioscia (C) and Alfredo Griffin (SS) combined for a total of just 36 home runs. Only Shelby had 10 or more home runs (he had exactly 10). Between them, José Canseco and Mark McGwire had hit 74 home runs for Oakland. Canseco alone had in fact hit more home runs (42) than the Dodger lineup while McGwire with 32 almost matched the Dodgers.

The Dodgers got two runs in the first when Steve Sax walked, went to third on a Mickey Hatcher single, and scored on a passed ball by A's catcher Terry Steinbach. Hatcher scored the second run on a groundout by John Shelby. The A's got one back in their half when Luis Polonia led off with a single, went to second on a passed ball, and later scored on a José Canseco groundout.

The Dodgers went up 3–1 when Franklin Stubbs doubled and scored when A's shortstop Walt Weiss couldn't field a liner by Mike Davis (the play was ruled an error.) The A's answered in the sixth on an RBI single by Carney Lansford.

A key play came when the Dodgers got their final run in the seventh. With Alfredo Griffin on third and Steve Sax on first with one out, pinch-hitter Tracy Woodson hit what looked to be an inning ending double play grounder. But Lasorda called for a hit and run play so Sax was going on the pitch. Oakland tried for the double play, but Sax barely beat the throw to second. So when the throw to first beat Woodson, it was only the second out, allowing Griffin to score.

The A's half of the seventh also dramatic.  With one out, Weiss singled and reached second when he was called safe on a double-play grounder hit by Polonia in a similar play to the Dodgers' scoring play in the top half of the inning; Weiss was running with the pitch. Dave Henderson cut the Dodger lead to 4–3 on a two-out RBI double. After Dodgers reliever Jay Howell entered the game, José Canseco walked and Dave Parker reached on a Griffin error to load the bases, but Game 3 hero Mark McGwire popped out, stranding three and ending the inning.

The A's managed to get singles in the eighth by Ron Hassey and in the ninth by Henderson, but Howell rebounded from his earlier postseason woes to stop both rallies, including striking out Canseco and inducing a foul pop out by Dave Parker in the ninth to strand the tying run at first and end the game.  The Dodgers now held a commanding three games to one lead.

While hosting Game 4 on NBC, Bob Costas angered many members of the Dodgers (especially manager Tommy Lasorda) by commenting before the start of the game that the Dodgers quite possibly were about to put up the weakest-hitting lineup in World Series history. That comment ironically fired up the competitive spirit of the Dodgers. Later (while being interviewed by NBC's Marv Albert), after the Dodgers had won Game 4, Lasorda sarcastically suggested that the MVP of the 1988 World Series should be Bob Costas.

Game 5

Orel Hershiser capped one of the greatest seasons ever by a starting pitcher and one of the most improbable World Series wins in history by pitching a complete game, allowing only four hits, two runs, and striking out nine. Stan Javier had both RBIs with a single and a sac fly.

In addition to Hershiser's performance, the Dodgers won because Mickey Hatcher stepped in for the hobbled Kirk Gibson in left field and provided spark, enthusiasm, and unexpected offense. He blasted his second home run in the Series off Oakland starter Storm Davis, a two-run shot, in the first inning; he had hit only one home run in the entire 1988 regular season.

Mike Davis, a disappointing free-agent signing for most of the 1988 season, added a two-run blast (on a 3-0 count) in the fourth off Davis, and former World Series MVP Rick Dempsey, filling in for an injured Mike Scioscia, drove in Davis with an RBI double in the sixth.

The only drama of the game briefly arose in the 8th inning: after Javier's single brought the lead to 5–2, Hershiser walked Dave Henderson to bring the tying run to the plate in the form of 42-homer man José Canseco.  Hershiser got him to pop out, and struck out Dave Parker to end the threat.  He struck out Tony Phillips for the final out to give the Dodgers their first World Championship since 1981.

Oakland came into the World Series heavily favored, but anything can happen in a short series, as proven by these 1988 Los Angeles Dodgers, who out-hit (41–28, .246–.177), out-muscled (5 HRs–2 HRs), and out-pitched (2.03–3.92) the seemingly unbeatable Oakland Athletics, incredibly winning the Series in five games, outscoring the A's, 21–11, bringing the Dodgers their sixth World Series Championship, the second as a manager for Tommy Lasorda. The Dodger pitching tamed Oakland monsters José Canseco (one hit, his grand slam in Game 1) and Mark McGwire (one hit and one RBI, which came on his Game 3 walk-off home run) for the entire series.

The Dodgers became the first (and so far only) team to have a perfect game pitched against them and win a World Series in the same season. Tom Browning of the Cincinnati Reds pitched that perfect game on September 16, 1988.

With the Lakers winning their fifth NBA championship in nine years four months before, the Dodgers winning the World Series made Los Angeles the first city to have both NBA and World Series champions in the same year. This accomplishment would be repeated in 2020, with the same two teams winning their respective championships again.

Composite line score
1988 World Series (4–1): Los Angeles Dodgers (N.L.) over Oakland Athletics (A.L.)

Television and radio coverage
The 1988 World Series marked the last time that NBC would televise a World Series for seven years. Beginning in 1990, NBC would be shut out of Major League Baseball coverage completely, after CBS signed a four-year, exclusive television contract. After splitting coverage of the 1995 World Series with ABC, NBC would next cover a World Series exclusively in 1997 and again in 1999. Beginning the following year, the fall classic would air exclusively on Fox (they had previously broadcast the 1996 and 1998 editions) where it has remained ever since.

Longtime Dodgers broadcaster Vin Scully called the Series for NBC along with Joe Garagiola; this was the last World Series that Scully would call on television (although he would subsequently call several more on CBS Radio). It was also the final World Series broadcast on either medium, and the final NBC telecast, for Garagiola. When the network returned from a commercial break at the start of the bottom of the ninth inning of Game 1, Scully stated (as NBC's cameras were panning the Dodgers' dugout) that Gibson (who wasn't in the dugout at the time) wouldn't play for sure. According to Gibson, who was watching the telecast in the Dodgers' clubhouse as the game started, Scully's comments in large part influenced his decision to want to bat.

As previously mentioned, Bob Costas, who along with Marv Albert, hosted NBC's World Series pregame coverage and handled postgame interviews made on-air statements that enraged many in the Dodgers' clubhouse (especially manager Tommy Lasorda). Costas said that the 1988 Dodgers possibly had the weakest hitting line-up in World Series history. After the Dodgers won Game 4, Lasorda (during a postgame interview with Marv Albert) sarcastically said that the MVP of the World Series should be Bob Costas.

On the radio side, Jack Buck and Bill White provided commentary for CBS Radio. This was Buck's sixth World Series call for CBS Radio and White's fifth. Game 5 was the final baseball broadcast for White, who had been calling games (primarily for the New York Yankees) since 1971; shortly after the Series ended he replaced Bart Giamatti as president of the National League.

The Series was also broadcast by the teams' local flagship radio stations using their own announcers. In the San Francisco Bay Area, KSFO aired the games with Bill King and Lon Simmons announcing, while in Los Angeles, KABC aired the games with Ross Porter and Don Drysdale announcing.

WMGT intrusion

On October 17, 1988, The Atlanta Constitution reported that NBC affiliate WMGT (based in Macon, Georgia) had its on-air feed hijacked during Game 1, which had aired two days prior. The paper reported that portions of the game's second inning were replaced on the station with snippets of an adult program for ten seconds. An unidentified technician from WMGT was then later fired by WMGT-TV's staff. The production manager for WMGT, L.A. Sturdivant, told the Constitution that the incident was "just an accident and not deliberately planned".

While footage of the hijack remains lost through time, television listings reported that HBO, Cinemax, The Movie Channel, or Showtime were all showing G to PG-13 rated films right at the time the second inning was played, and all four channels were part of Macon's Cox Cable systems. Due to the harm of explicit content, it was possible that WMGT accidentally hijacked and plastered NBC's broadcast of the second inning with a snippet of the Playboy Channel off of a C-band satellite antenna for 10 seconds before plastering back to the World Series. Sturdivant received many phone calls from WMGT's studios in Macon, stating that the hijack lasted a minimum of three seconds and a maximum of 30 seconds, but the Constitution report on the finalized timing stated that the hijack had lasted for ten seconds. Sturdivant told the paper that "it's being treated as a serious matter".

Aftermath
This was the last World Series that Peter Ueberroth presided over as commissioner. Incidentally, Ueberroth rose to prominence for organizing the 1984 Summer Olympic Games in Los Angeles.

Following this confrontation, both teams appeared on Family Feud with Ray Combs for a special sweeps week billed as a World Series Rematch.

1987-1993 A's reliever Rick Honeycutt would later serve as the Dodgers pitching coach for 13 years (2006-2019).

The Dodgers would not make another World Series appearance until 2017, where they would controversially lose in seven games against the Houston Astros, who won their first World Series title amidst a sign stealing scandal. The Dodgers would make another World Series appearance the following year in 2018, but lost to the Boston Red Sox in five games, marking the first time the Dodgers lost back-to-back World Series since 1977 and 1978, where they lost both World Series to the New York Yankees. They wouldn't win another World Series until 2020.

The A's made it to the World Series the next two years, winning the 1989 "Loma Prieta earthquake" series 4-0 vs. the San Francisco Giants and being swept by the Cincinnati Reds 4–0 in 1990. The A's haven't appeared in the World Series since. The closest the A's have gotten to the World Series since that time was in 1992, when they lost to the Toronto Blue Jays in the American League Championship Series in six games and 2006, when they lost to the Detroit Tigers in the ALCS in a four-game sweep.

Before the start of the 2018 season, the Dodgers commemorated the anniversary of Gibson's homerun with the introduction of the “Kirk Gibson seat,” which is where his home run landed after winning Game 1 of the 1988 World Series. The seat in question was Section 302, Row D, Seat 1, though the Dodgers have renumbered that seat 88. The seat will be painted blue and signed by Gibson and the tickets cost $300, which includes a $200 donation to the Kirk Gibson Foundation to raise money and awareness for Parkinson’s Research.

In Game 4 of the 2018 World Series between the Dodgers and the Red Sox, 30 years after that 1988 World Series walk-off home run, Dennis Eckersley (who was there covering the Red Sox as a NESN color commentator and analyst) and Kirk Gibson reunited for the ceremonial first pitch at Dodger Stadium and Gibson had a bat ready before catching Eckersley's pitch.

The Dodgers World Series capped off a spectacular decade of sports for the city of Los Angeles. As mentioned above, Los Angeles hosted the 1984 Summer Olympics, its first since hosting the 1932 Summer Olympics. In terms of team sports, the Showtime Lakers won five NBA championships in the decade (including one in 1988), the Raiders moved from Oakland to Los Angeles and won the city's first (and until the Rams in Super Bowl LVI, only) Super Bowl, and the Los Angeles Kings traded for Wayne Gretzky in August 1988, who was even at that time considered the greatest hockey player ever. For their part, the Dodgers were the only team to win more than one World Series in the 1980s. 32 years later in 2020, the Dodgers and Lakers would again win a World Series and NBA Finals in the same season.

This would be the final World Series Vin Scully called on either television or radio that featured the Los Angeles Dodgers. The next time the Dodgers advanced to the World Series (2017), Charley Steiner was now the radio play-by-play announcer and went on to call Los Angeles's victory over Tampa Bay in 2020 (Scully had retired from broadcasting after the 2016 season).

Quotes

Notes

See also
1988 Japan Series

References

External links

Destiny's Boys at SI.com
1988 NLCS | Game 4
1988 Los Angeles Dodgers at baseballlibrary.com
1988 Oakland Athletics at baseballlibrary.com
Baseball's 25 Greatest Moments: Kirk Gibson's Home Run

World Series
World Series
Los Angeles Dodgers postseason
Oakland Athletics postseason
World Series
20th century in Oakland, California
October 1988 sports events in the United States
Baseball competitions in Los Angeles
Baseball competitions in Oakland, California
World